Jonathan Barry Janse van Rensburg (born 27 February 1989 in Pietermaritzburg, South Africa) is a South African rugby union player for Slava Moscow in the Russian Rugby Premier League. His regular position is number eight.

Career

UP Tuks / Blue Bulls

Janse van Rensburg played rugby for Pretoria-based university side  between 2011 and 2014. 

He was also included in the  squad for the 2012 Currie Cup Premier Division competition, but failed to make any appearances for the Blue Bulls.

Griquas

In 2015, Janse van Rensburg moved to Kimberley to join .

References

1989 births
Living people
Griquas (rugby union) players
Rugby union number eights
Rugby union players from Pietermaritzburg
South African rugby union players